The men's canoe slalom C-2 competition at the 2012 Olympic Games in London took place between 30 July and 2 August at the Lee Valley White Water Centre. Twenty-eight canoeists from 12 countries competed.

Great Britain's Tim Baillie and Etienne Stott won the gold medal and David Florence and Richard Hounslow won silver. Twin brothers Pavol and Peter Hochschorner of Slovakia won the bronze.

Competition format
In the heats, each competitor had two runs; the 10 teams with the best time qualified for the semi-finals. Each semi-final consisted of one run each and the best six qualified for the final. The final saw one run each where the team with the best time won the gold medal.

Schedule 
All times are British Summer Time (UTC+01:00)

Results

Gallery

References

Men's slalom C-2
Men's events at the 2012 Summer Olympics